Sushma Joshi is a Nepali writer, filmmaker based in Kathmandu, Nepal. Her fiction and non-fiction deal with Nepal's civil conflict, as well as stories of globalization, migration and diaspora.

End of the World, her book of short stories, was long-listed for the Frank O'Connor International Short Story Award in 2009. "The Prediction", another book of short stories that bring together stories of tradition and modernity, was published in 2013. Art Matters, a book of essays about contemporary art, was supported by the Alliance Française de Katmandou.

Her non-fiction reportage has appeared in The Kathmandu Post, The Nation Weekly, Indian Express (USA), Republica, and other publications.

Career 
From 1998 to 2000, Joshi worked with the Harvard School of Public Health to implement the Global Reproductive Health Forum, a health and rights program, in South Asia. She traveled to Mumbai, Delhi and Dacca to bring together a broad coalition of partners in this reproductive health and rights network. She also started re/productions, a journal on health and rights, during this time. Their research was catalogued in a digital library and handed over to SNDT Women's University, Mumbai. Bol!, a list-serv with 600 activists and professionals working in health and rights, was handed over to the Center for Women and Development in Delhi.

In 2004, Joshi joined as staff writer at the newly formed The Nation Weekly, a political news weekly in Kathmandu.

She also consulted for the UNDP's Access to Justice research program from October 2004, during the height of the civil conflict. As part of a 6-member team, Joshi went to different areas of Nepal to document stories about human rights violations and the erosion of formal and informal justice systems.

In 2005, she received a fellowship in research and writing from the MacArthur Foundation , and travelled to Mumbai to document the situation of Nepali women who were rescued and rehabilitated from the redlight districts in homes. In 2006, she made several short films in the directing program at the New York Film Academy in Paris, including "The Escape" which deals with the human rights violations which occurred during the People's War in Nepal. This film was accepted to the Berlinale Film Festival's Talent Campus, which was later renamed the Berlinale Talents, in 2007. She also wrote her play "I Killed My Best Friend's Father," about two girls and their friendship post-conflict, in 2007.

In 2008, she joined Chemonics to work in the Nepal Transition Initiative as a media officer, where she became engaged in a broad number of media projects related to the transition from conflict to peace. In 2009, she also headed a project for six months to train 20 journalists from rural newspapers to write on issues of Nepal's new Constitution. In 2010, she joined the Office of the United Nations High Commissioner for Human Rights in Kathmandu, where she spent the year working on the Nepal conflict report about the violations committed during the conflict with a research team. Between 2008 and 2010, she also consulted for the World Bank on their countrywide assistance strategy, traveling with the heads of World Bank, DFID and ADB to different locations to document the feedback received from local participants during the meetings. In 2011, she received a fellowship from the Asian Scholarship Foundation in Thailand to conduct research on the Gorkhali diaspora in Myanmar and Thailand.

Since 2012, she has been working as a freelance journalist, and has also started her own media and publishing house Sansar Media.

Awards
Joshi received a writer fellowship to attend the Bread Loaf Writers' Conference in 2000. In 2005, she received a research and writing fellowship from the MacArthur Foundation. She was awarded a residency at the Bellagio Center, sponsored by the Rockefeller Foundation, in Bellagio, Italy, in 2006. Joshi was a featured writer at the Ubud Writers and Readers Festival in 2009. In 2011, she was an Asia fellow and traveled to Thailand and Burma to do research on a book about Nepali migrants, with support from the Asian Scholarship Foundation. She has also received fellowships from the Toyota Foundation, the Ludwig Vogelstein Foundation, as well as a seed fund from the Hubert Bals Fund in the Netherlands.

Joshi was a jury member of the Indigenous Film Festival in Nepal in 2009. She was also a member of a three-judge panel for the film competition on global warming sponsored by the British Council and Department for International Development in Kathmandu in 2010.

Plays 
Her play, I Killed My Best Friend's Father, about two teenagers who survive the civil conflict in Nepal, was stage-read at the Arcola Theatre in London as part of the Kali TalkBack Festival on December 8, 2012.

Film 
Sound of Silence (1997) was screened at the New Asian Currents at the Yamagata Documentary Film Festival.

"Water" (2000)  part of a series of documentaries on water from seven countries produced by IRC Netherlands and Ton Schouten Productions, was screened on the Q and A with Riz Khan on CNN International, and the UN World Water Forum in Kyoto. WATER has also been screened at Columbia University's Southern Asia Institute, Flickerfest Film Festival in Sydney, Vancouver Nepali Film Festival, Himalayan Film Festival in London, and other venues.

The Escape (2006), a short fiction film about a teacher targeted by rebels, was shot at the New York Film Academy in Paris, and was accepted to the Berlinale Talent Campus in 2007.
 
"Supportive Men" (2014)  shows young men starting a movement for gender equality by sharing housework and cooking in a Dalit community in Southern Nepal. The film was made for CARE Nepal, Norway, Austria and USA.

In 2014, Joshi also consulted and researched for the script of "Singha Durbar," a fictional TV series featuring a female prime minister, produced by Search for Common Ground and funded by USAID.

Art 
"The Quake", about the artist's survival after being buried in the 2015 Nepal earthquake, was exhibited at the World Bank in Washington DC as part of the 2020 Art of Resilience exhibition.

In 2004, Joshi had a solo exhibit "Blue Nepal" at Gallery Nine in Kathmandu. The exhibit was of 26 figurative paintings depicting the state of Nepal during the civil conflict.

Joshi's multimedia installation titled Jumla: A cyberphoto installation was accepted to the Eighth International Symposium on Electronic Art, or ISEA97 at the Art Institute of Chicago in 1997.

Education and influences
Joshi was born and grew up in Kathmandu. From age 8 to 12, she studied in Dowhill School, Kurseong, in the district of Darjeeling. She finished her education at Mahendra Bhawan and Siddhartha Vanasthali High School in Kathmandu.

Joshi went to the US at age 18 to study at Brown University. She graduated from Brown University in the US in 1996 with a BA in international relations. She also took workshops in fiction, autobiography and poetry, and classes in documentary production with the artist Tony Cokes. From 1999 to 2002, she was in graduate school at the New School For Social Research in New York, where she received an MA in anthropology. During the summers, she attended The Breadloaf School of English at Middlebury College, Vermont, and received another MA in English Literature in 2005. At Bread Loaf, she studied playwriting with the 1998–1999 Obie Award winning playwright Dare Clubb, as well as theatre directing and acting with Alan and Carol MacVey.

Books and Anthologies 
"Global Nepalis: Religion, Culture, and Community in a New and Old Diaspora", Eds David N. Gellner & Sondra L. Hausner, Oxford University Press, 2018
"The Himalayan Arc", an anthology edited by Namita Gokhale, co-founder of Jaipur Literary Festival, HarperCollins India, 2018
"House of Snow", A collection of the greatest writing about Nepal, Head of Zeus, 2016
"The Prediction", Sansar Media, Kathmandu, Nepal, 2013
"The Other Side of Terror: An Anthology of Writings on Terrorism in South Asia; Ed. Nivedita Majumdar, Oxford University Press, 2012
"The Lotus Singers" Ed. Trevor Carolan, Cheng and Tsui Company, 2011
"The Mammoth Book of Apocalyptic Sci-Fi"; Ed. Mike Ashley; Little, Brown, 2010
"The End of the World": Longlisted for the Frank O’Connor Short Story Award, Fineprint, Nepal, 2008
"New Nepal, New Voices: An anthology of Nepali writing", Rupa, India 2008
"Art Matters" Sansar Media, Kathmandu, Nepal 2008
"Defending our Dreams, Global Feminist Voices for a New Generation", Eds. Shamillah Wilson et al. Zed Books 2005
"Shock and Awe", Ed. Anna Tsing, Four Corner Books 2004
"Sexual Sites, Seminal Attitudes: Sexualities, Masculinities and Culture in South Asia" Ed. Sajaya Srivastava, SAGE, California, USA, 2004
"Greenwood Encyclopedia of Women's Issues Worldwide", Editors Lynn Walter and Manisha Desai, Westport, Conn.: Greenwood Press, USA, 2003
"An Other Voice: English Literature from Nepal", Martin Chautari, Kathmandu, Nepal, 2002
"‘Cheli-Beti’ Discourses of Trafficking and Constructions of Gender, Citizenship and Nation in Modern Nepal' Special edition of South Asia, Deakins University, Melbourne, Australia, 1999

Selected stories 
"No Place Like Home",  Mascara Review, Sydney, Australia, Winter 2021
"How I Healed from the Nepal Earthquake",  Kyoto Journal Issue 95, Kyoto, Japan, September 2019
"Ming's Defense", Southward, Munster Literature Centre, Ireland, Summer 2017
"In Search of Rubies", Emanations: I Am Not a Number, 2017 
"Chorus of Life", Kyoto Journal, Japan, November 2016
"Orange Peel" Far Cry Zine, USA, October 2016 
"In the Pool Lies Two Dead Bodies", Republica, Nepal, January 2016
"The Zia Motel", Emanations, USA, 2015
"Search for a Buddha without Borders", Irrawaddy, Thailand, 2014
"The Prediction", Himalaya, The Journal of the Association for Nepal and Himalaya Studies, Yale University, USA, 2014
"The Fourth Child" ECS Magazine, Dashain Fiction special, Kathmandu, Nepal, 2014
"A Boleria For Love" LA.Lit Magazine, Kathmandu, Nepal, 2014
"The Promised Land" Of Nepalese Clay, Kathmandu, Nepal, April 2014
"The Death of Rammohan Adhikari", Of Nepalese Clay, Kathmandu, Nepal 2013
The End of The World Translated in simplified Chinese, Yeeyan.org, 2013
"La Scoperta dell' alto Lama", El Ghibli, Italy, June 2013
"Soft Things", Mascara, Australia, November 2012
What we can learn from Burma, Future Challenges, Germany, January 2012
"The Gorkhalis of Myitkyina", Himal South Asia, Nepal, October 2011
"The Discovery of the High Lama", East of the Web, UK, 2011
"The Mammoth Book of Apocalyptic Sci-Fi", The Mammoth Book of Apocalyptic Sci-Fi, UK, 2010
"A Bowl of Zuppa" El-Ghibli, Italy, Anno 7, Numero 28 issue, June 2010
"The Little Girl Who Died" (Excerpt of the story), World Literature Today, Oklahoma, USA, 2010
"I Woke Up Last Night and I Cried" New Asian Writing, Thailand, 2010
"The Promised Land" Itch Literary Journal, South Africa, June 2010
Betrayal Happano (Japanese translation), Japan, 2010 
"The Blockade" East of the Web, UK, 2009
"The Colonel Gets a Visitor", Kyoto Journal, Japan, January 2009 
"Betrayal", Cha: An Asian Literary Journal, Issue 3, HongKong, May 2008
"Cheese", Buran, Il Cibo, Italy, February 2008 (Italian translation)
"Ngày tận thế (truyện ngắn)" Vietnam (Vietnamese translation)
"'Red pole' justice in Nepal", Eureka Street, Volume 16 No.6, Australia, June 12, 2006
"War-Torn Shangri-La", Ms. Magazine USA, Summer 2006
"Short Takes: News from all over", Utne Reader September 2006
"Pho Mai", Viet Bao, 2005 (Vietnamese translation)
"Cheese", East of the Web, UK, 2005
"Towards A Global Network of Rights: The Experience of Nepal", EUMAP, USA, 2004
"Bonded To Labor", SAMAR Magazine (South Asian Magazine for Action and Reflection), New York, 12/16/2003
"Anzaldua at the Liminal Edges of Identity", Mosaic Magazine, USA, 2001
Internet: Bridge or Digital Divide? (Prize for I-Mahal Essay Contest), 2001
"Women’s Day in Nepal", Hinduism Today, USA, September/October 2000
"Waiting for Rain", Samar, Issue 13, Winter/Spring 2000 
"De smaak van vroeger", Ode magazine, The Netherlands, 27 July/August 1999 issue
"Culture Shock in Kathmandu", "Utne Reader", 1998
 Of Cabbages and Men: An interview with artist Sashikala Tiwari, Earshot Magazine, Kathmandu, Nov 1998

Selected recent articles 
" "Disband the UN", Annapurna Express, 29 November 2019
"Homo Insapiens", Annapurna Express, 31 May 2019
"The Circular Economy is a Myth", Annapurna Express, 3 May 2019

External Reports
 Access to Justice Assessments in the Asia Pacific: A Review of Experiences and Tools from the Region, UNDP, 2012
 Nepal Conflict Report: Executive Summary, OHCHR, 2012
 Nepalis in Diaspora, Oxford University, June 2012
 Evidence for Education Policy and Planning: Keeping Children at the center, UNICEF, 2009
 Office of Transitional Initiatives/OTI Nepal Program Evaluation (2006-2009)
 Archive of the Nation Weekly Magazine at Digital Himalaya (2004-2005)
 International Association for the Study of Forced Migration, 2004

Festivals, Awards
 Kali TalkBack Festival, London, 2012
 Writers panel at SDPI's Redefining Paradigms of Development in South Asia, Islamabad, 2011
 Frank O Connor International Short Story Award (longlist), 2009
 Ubud Readers and Writers Festival, Bali, 2009
 Berlinale Talent Campus, Berlin, 2007
 New Asian Currents Yamagata International Documentary Film Festival, Yamagata, 1997

Press 
In the Shadow of the Peak, book review of "The Himalayan Arc: Journeys East of South-East" The Telegraph, August 17, 2018
Kathmandu Post review of "House of Snow" September 24, 2016
 Nepal earthquake anthology profits to go to charity The Bookseller, April 28, 2016
 Read the World - PROPORTIONALLY! 100 Books from Around the World 2014
 A Portrait of the Artist Kathmandu Post, 2014
 The End of the World by Sushma Joshi Book Dragon, Smithsonian Asian Pacific American Center, September 2012
 We Must Look Towards East For Sustainable Development PPI,  Islamabad December 13, 2011
 Proactive Author Aims to Encourage Nepali Writers South China Morning Post, 28 August 2011
 Review of "The End of the World" by Sumati Sivasiamphai, Guru Magazine, Friday Supplement of the Bangkok Post 08/2011
 An Affair to Remember, Janet O'Neefe, Garuda Indonesia November 2009
 Ubud Writers and Readers Festival: A Star Studded Event, Janet O'Neefe, Garuda Indonesia November 2009
 Words Amidst Beauty, Lee Su kim, Malaysia Star October 18, 2009
 Filling the Gap, Sushma Joshi starts a new beginning for English medium literature in Nepal, WAVE Magazine July 2009
 Book Review: And, Of The Word, Deepak Adhikari, Nepal Monitor 2009
 Listing of "New Nepal, New Voices" in "Dal Mondo," Internazionale 21 November 2008
 Celebration Time in Gallery 9 2007
 International panelists discuss labor in Asia, The Michigan Daily 11 December 2001
 What's Art Got To Do With It? Chicago Tribune, 23 September 1997

References

1973 births
Living people
People from Kathmandu
Nepali-language writers
Brown University alumni
21st-century Nepalese writers
21st-century Nepalese women writers